Sono is a department of Kossi Province in western Burkina Faso. It is in the Boucle du Mouhoun Region. The capital of the department is Sono. The population of the department in 2006 was 7,276.

Towns and villages
 Sono (3 241 inhabitants) (Capital)
 Bantombo	(571 inhabitants)
 Botte (302 inhabitants)
 Dankoumana	(790 inhabitants)
 Kallé	(812 inhabitants)
 Koury	(713 inhabitants)
 Lanfiera-koura	(67 inhabitants)
 Siéla	(460 inhabitants)
 Soro	(241 inhabitants)
 Zampana	(123 inhabitants)

References

Departments of Burkina Faso
Kossi Province